The men's 50 km madison competition at the 2006 Asian Games was held on 14 December at the Aspire Hall 1.

Schedule
All times are Arabia Standard Time (UTC+03:00)

Results
Legend
DNF — Did not finish

References

External links 
Results

Track Men madison